A Dweller on Two Planets  or The Dividing of the Way is a book written by Frederick Spencer Oliver, who was born in 1866. The book was finished in 1886 and in 1894 the manuscript was typewritten and copyrighted and again in 1899, owing to an addition. It was not published until 1905, by his mother Mary Elizabeth Manley-Oliver, six years after Oliver's death in 1899.

In the amanuensis preface, Oliver presents the book as a true account of the actual past of the true author, called "Phylos The Thibetan", otherwise identified as: "Yol Gorro" (under image in 1952 1st Bordon Pub. edition)

Plot summary

In its introduction, Oliver claims that the book had been channeled through him via automatic writing, visions and mental "dictations", by a spirit calling himself Phylos the Thibetan who revealed the story to him over a period of three years, beginning in 1883.

Concerning itself with Atlantis, it portrays a first person account of Atlantean culture which had reached a high level of technological and scientific advancement. His personal history and that of a group of souls with whom Phylos closely interacted is portrayed in the context of the social, economic, political and religious structures that shaped Poseid society. Daily life for Poseidi citizens included such things as antigravity powered air craft and submarines, television, wireless telephony, aerial water generators, air conditioners and high-speed rail.  The book deals with deep esoteric subjects including karma and re-incarnation and describes Phylos' final incarnation in 19th century America where his Atlantean karma played itself out. In that incarnation (as Walter Pierson, gold miner and occult student of the Theo-Christic Adepts) he travelled to Venus/Hysperia in a subtle body while his physical form remained at the temple inside Mount Shasta. Describing his experience with the Hesperian adepts, Phylos relates many wonders including artworks depicting 3D scenes that appeared alive. He saw a voice-operated typewriter and other occult and technical power. Some devices mentioned have become reality (such as the TV and the atomic telescope).

In a detailed personal history of Atlantis and 19th century North America, Phylos draws the threads of both lifetimes together in familiar and initiatic terms revealing equally their triumphs and failures and exposing the cause and effects of karma from one lifetime to another. His life story is written in personal testimony of the law: "whatsoever a man soweth, that shall he also reap" and as a warning to this technological age to not repeat the mistakes of the past that led to the cataclysmic destruction of "Poseid, queen of the waves".

Influences

The book has been influential on ideas concerning Atlantis, Lemuria and Mount Shasta. In a 2002 introduction, John B. Hare says that it "is openly acknowledged as source material for many new age belief systems, including the "I AM" movement, the Lemurian Fellowship, and Elizabeth Claire Prophet." In the analysis of Walter Kafton-Minkel's history Subterranean Worlds, "A Dweller on Two Planets was not very good fiction, but it did establish all the main elements of the modern Mt. Shasta mythos."

In 1940, the Lemurian Fellowship published a "sequel" with the title An Earth Dweller's Return.

References

Bibliography
Oliver, Frederick S. Amanuensis Preface in: Phylos the Thibetan. A Dweller on Two Planets or The Dividing of the Way. Los Angeles: Poseid Publishing, 1920.

External links
 A Dweller on Two Planets (entire text)
 
 

1905 books
New Age books
Books about Atlantis
Lemuria (continent)
Channelled texts